Merelina is a genus of minute sea snails, marine gastropod mollusks or micromollusks in the family Lironobidae.

Species
Species within the genus Merelina include:

 † Merelina avita Marwick, 1928 
 Merelina cancellata Criscione & Ponder, 2011
 Merelina cheilostoma (Tenison Woods, 1877)
 Merelina cochleata Powell, 1927
 Merelina compacta Powell, 1937
 Merelina coronata (Powell, 1926)
 Merelina crassissima Powell, 1937
 Merelina crispulata Powell, 1937
 Merelina crossaeformis (Powell, 1926)
 † Merelina effodita Laws, 1950 
 Merelina elegans (Angas, 1877)
 Merelina foliata (Suter, 1908)
 Merelina gracilis (Angas, 1877)
 Merelina harrisonae Powell, 1939
 Merelina hirta Criscione & Ponder, 2011
 † Merelina kaawensis Laws, 1936 
 Merelina lacunosa (Powell, 1926)
 Merelina lordhowensis Criscione & Ponder, 2011
 Merelina lyalliana (Suter, 1898)
 Merelina manawatawhia Powell, 1937
 Merelina maoriana Powell, 1939
 Merelina norfolkensis Criscione & Ponder, 2011
 Merelina pagodiformis (G.B. Sowerby III, 1914)
 Merelina pauereques Powell, 1937
 Merelina petronella (Melvill & Standen, 1901)
 Merelina pisinna (Melvill & Standen, 1896)
 Merelina plaga Finlay, 1926
 Merelina queenslandica Laseron, 1956
 Merelina rubiginosa Ponder, 1967
 † Merelina saginata Laws, 1939 
 Merelina superba Powell, 1927
 Merelina taupoensis Powell, 1939
 † Merelina telkibana Ladd, 1966 
 Merelina tricarinata Powell, 1937
 † Merelina waiotemarama Laws, 1948 
 Merelina waitangiensis Powell, 1933

 Species brought into synonymy
 Merelina corruga Laseron, 1956 : synonym of Manzonia corruga (Laseron, 1956)
 Merelina crassula Rehder, 1980 : synonym of Manzonia crassula (Rehder, 1980)
 Merelina cyrta Cotton, 1944 : synonym of Alvania hedleyi Thiele, 1930
 Merelina eminens Laseron, 1950 : synonym of Alvania fasciata (Tenison Woods, 1876)
 Merelina goliath Laseron, 1956 : synonym of Iravadia quadrasi (Boettger, 1893)
 Merelina granulosa (Pease, 1862) accepted as Manzonia granulosa (Pease, 1862)
 Merelina hewa Kay, 1979 : synonym of Manzonia hewa (Kay, 1979)
 Merelina hians Laseron, 1957 : synonym of Sansoniella minuta (Hornung & Mermod, 1927)
 Merelina humera Laseron, 1956 : synonym of Iravadia quadrasi (Boettger, 1893)
 Merelina longinqua Rehder, 1980 : synonym of Manzonia longinqua (Rehder, 1980)
 Merelina reversa Laseron, 1956 : synonym of Iravadia quadrasi (Boettger, 1893)
 Merelina sculptilis May, 1920 : synonym of Alvania sculptilis (May, 1920)
 Merelina solida Laseron, 1956 : synonym of Iravadia mahimensis (Melvill, 1893)
 Merelina subreticulata Laseron, 1950 : synonym of Alvania suprasculpta (May, 1915)
 Merelina sucina Laseron, 1956 a: synonym of Iravadia mahimensis (Melvill, 1893)
 Merelina tokyoensis (Pilsbry, 1904) : synonym of Manzonia tokyoensis (Pilsbry, 1904)
 Merelina wanawana Kay, 1979 : synonym of Manzonia wanawana (Kay, 1979)

References

 Ponder W. F. (1985). A review of the Genera of the Rissoidae (Mollusca: Mesogastropoda: Rissoacea). Records of the Australian Museum supplement 4: 1-221
 Spencer, H.; Marshall. B. (2009). All Mollusca except Opisthobranchia. In: Gordon, D. (Ed.) (2009). New Zealand Inventory of Biodiversity. Volume One: Kingdom Animalia. 584 pp
 Criscione F. & Ponder W.F. (2011) A review of the Recent Australian species of Merelina Iredale, 1915 (Caenogastropoda: Rissoidae). Molluscan Research 31(2): 65–84. abstract

Lironobidae
Gastropod genera